The Stádlec Suspension Bridge over the Lužnice river is located near the market town of Stádlec, Czech Republic. It is the last surviving suspension bridge built in empire style in the Czech Republic. Originally, between  1848–1960, it spanned the Vltava river near Podolsko, South Bohemian region.

it was dismantled between 1960–1975  and moved to its present location near Stádlec.

Since 1989 it has been on the on Czech national cultural monuments list.

History 
The bridge, designed by engineers Gassner and Friedrich Schnirch, was built by Vojtěch Lanna between 1847–1848 over the Vltava in Podolsko. It replaced the  old ferry that at that time could not handle the growing traffic between Bavaria and Galicia. The bridge served for many years until 1960 when it was decided to take it down. The reason being that there was already a 510 meters long reinforced concrete bridge from 1942 towering above it  and also the Orlík dam was being filled and that  would flood the bridge, at that time already a cultural monument. The bridge was dismantled, documented and stored at Markův mlýn. For ten years it has been waiting there for its new home. Finally a  picturesque location on the Lužnice near Stádlec was chosen from several possible locations. After the relocation, the bridge has been in operation since the opening ceremony on May 25, 1975, connecting  townships Stádlec and Dobřejice.

Relocation 
The bridge was dismantled into 2,000 blocks and 1,100 steel parts and then reassembled. After ten years of temporary storage, however, some of the iron parts of the chains were damaged or missing at all, making it much more difficult to recover. Of the total weight 102 tons of the iron parts, 14 tons had to be recreated, and some new stone blocks had to be delivered. How difficult the dismantling and rebuilding was shows the fact that at some point the officials considered to shorten the bridge from the original 90 m length to only 60 meters.

The construction was completed on May 25, 1975 by the ceremonial insertion of a memorial stone into the right bank pylon. The total relocation cost was 11 837 000 Kčs (at that time).

Description 
The basic supporting structure consists of four chains arranged in two pairs. These are connected to the wooden deck by vertical rods. The chains are pulled through the holes in the two stone pylons bounding the bridge and anchored in the bricked stone blocks. The stone pylons form 4 m x m x 10 m bridge "gates".The pylon height is 13 m. The bridge is 6 m wide, 157 m long. Bridge tonnage is limited to 2.5 tons. The deck consists of oak planks, which were newly installed in 2007. The deck is 5 m above the water level. A mobile catwalk  for minor repairs is installed under the deck.

Reconstruction 
In 2005, during a general bridge  inspection, it was noted that the wooden deck was significantly damaged. A total bridge reconstruction was scheduled for 2006-7. Repair cost was 3.5 million CZK.

In September 2019 the council of the South Bohemian region endorsed the bridge repair. The estimated cost is 10 162 000 CZK and the work should commence in 2020. The unique bridgework is currently in disrepair since the wooden parts are attacked by a highly invasive and dangerous wood decaying fungus. The repair will include the replacement of all wooden parts and also anti-corrosion measures of the steel parts.

Recognition 
In 1959 the bridge was declared a cultural monument. Since 1989  it has been on the on Czech national cultural monuments list

In 2009 the Czech National bank issued a 2500 CZK commemorative gold coin as part of the Industrial Heritage Sites series. The coin was designed by Luboš Charvát.

In 2018 a postage stamp depicting the Podolský and Stádlecký bridges was issued. The stamp with a face value of CZK 35 was designed by Milan Bauer, engraved by Václav Fajt.

Gallery

References 

Suspension bridges
National Cultural Monuments of the Czech Republic
Bridges over the Lužnice
Bridges completed in 1848
Bridges completed in 1975
Tábor District